Eucamptognathus diacritus is a species of ground beetle in the subfamily Pterostichinae. It was described by Alluaud in 1913.

References

Eucamptognathus
Beetles described in 1913